Our Own House is the debut studio album by American indie pop band MisterWives, released on February 24, 2015 through Photo Finish Records. As of July 2015, it has reached No. 31 on the Billboard 200. Four songs from the album, "Reflections", "Coffins", "Imagination Infatuation" and "Vagabond", previously appeared on the band's debut extended play (EP) Reflections.

Critical reception

The album has received mostly positive reviews. Garrett Kamps of Billboard stated that the album is filled with "rock 'em, sock' em" action. Timothy Monger of AllMusic, while rating the album three out of five stars, still called the album "pleasant". Alex Bear of idobi Radio acclaimed the album, stating that it has a "fresh, dynamic sound" and that it is "the only album [consumers] will need this spring".

Track listing

Personnel
Adapted credits from the liner notes of Our Own House.

MisterWives
 Mandy Lee – lead vocals, backup vocals, gang vocals
 Etienne Bowler – drums, percussion
 William Hehir – bass, backup vocals, gang vocals
 Marc Campbell – guitar
 Jesse Blum – trumpet, keyboards, accordion

Additional musicians
 Michael Murphy – saxophone (tracks 1, 2, 5, 10)
 Kate Spingarn – cello (track 7)
 Katie Kresek – violin (track 7)

Production
 Frequency – producer
 Etienne Bowler – co-producer, programming
 Danny Rico – producer, engineer (track 11)
 Neal Avron – mixing
 Bryan Fryzel – mixing (track 3)
 Joe LaPorta – mastering

Artwork
 These Quiet Studios – illustrations
 Mandy Lee – art direction and design, cover concept
 Glynis Carpenter – photography
 Joe Spix – art direction and design

Charts

References

External links
 

2015 debut albums
MisterWives albums
Photo Finish Records albums
Albums produced by Frequency (record producer)